William "Buxton" Smith was an English footballer. He played at half-back for Buxton and Manchester City. He is often confused with another William Smith who played for Manchester City at the same time; because of this, they were known to Manchester City fans by the clubs they were signed from, with this William Smith referred to as "Buxton Smith" and the other as "Stockport Smith".

Career
He moved to Manchester City in the close season in 1897, he made his debut on the opening game of the 1897/98 season against Gainsborough Trinity, he then only missed four league games in the next four seasons, and played in all 34 matches during there promotion from Division Two in 1898/99.

Career statistics

References

English footballers
Manchester City F.C. players
Year of birth missing
Year of death missing
English Football League players
Buxton F.C. players
Association football wing halves